Metropolitan Electric Tramways Limited (MET) operated electric tram services in suburban areas of Middlesex and Hertfordshire from 1904 to 1933, when its services passed to the London Passenger Transport Board.

History

The company originated in 1894 as the Metropolitan Tramways and Omnibus Company Limited. The company hoped to construct horse tramways in the northern suburbs of London. The proposed tramways were not built, but an agreement was entered into with Middlesex County Council to operate the tramway network it was constructing under the Light Railways Act 1896. The company was acquired by British Electric Traction (BET) in 1901, and its name changed to Metropolitan Electric Tramways Ltd. (MET).

The first section of line was opened on 22 July 1904, with services from Finsbury Park to Manor House (where a connection with the London County Council Tramways was made) and Wood Green. On 3 December a separate section from Cricklewood to Edgware via Hendon opened.

The network was rapidly expanded between 1905 and 1911, MET having gained powers to build its own lines as well as operating those constructed by the county council, and by the acquisition and electrification of the North Metropolitan Tramways Company's steam-operated line from Wood Green to Ponders End.

The MET operated London's only regular single-deck electric tram services, on two tram lines serving Alexandra Palace. The first line ran from Turnpike Lane, approaching the Palace from the West via Muswell Hill, and was opened in late 1905; the second line opened a few months later in 1906, and started from Wood Green, entering the Palace grounds from the East.

On 1 January 1913, MET became a subsidiary of the London and Suburban Traction Company (LSTC), jointly owned by BET and the Underground Group. LSTC also owned the two other company-operated tramways in London, London United Tramways (LUT) and South Metropolitan Electric Tramways (SouthMET).

When MET was taken over by the London Passenger Transport Board on 1 July 1933, it was operating  of route.

The outer termini of the MET network were Acton (where it connected with the LUT system), Sudbury, Canons Park, Barnet, Enfield and Waltham Cross. Joint-running with the LUT and London County Council systems brought MET trams into Central and West London.

Tramcars

Not all trams survived into London Transport ownership, and many that did were withdrawn before receiving their new LT numbers.

Many of the modern UCC (Feltham) tramcars were sold for further service in Leeds (331 going to Sunderland), lasting until the late 1950s.

Sources
 
 
 
 
 

Trams in London
Defunct intermodal transport authorities